Northwest Branch Anacostia River is a  free-flowing stream in Montgomery County and Prince George's County, Maryland. It is a tributary of the Anacostia River, which flows to the Potomac River and the Chesapeake Bay.

Course
The headwaters of the Northwest Branch are located near the community of Sandy Spring.

Watershed
The watershed in Montgomery County includes portions of the communities of Norwood, Bel Pre Manor, Colesville, Layhill, Glenmont, Wheaton, Hillandale, White Oak, Silver Spring, Kemp Mill, Four Corners, Woodmoor and Takoma Park. The Prince George's County portion of the watershed includes Adelphi, Langley Park, University Park, Chillum, Hyattsville, Avondale and Brentwood.

The middle section of the Northwest Branch is referred to as the Rachel Carson Environmental Area. It flows through a small gorge underneath the Capital Beltway between Colesville Road and Adelphi Mill.  Located at the north end of the Northwest Branch Trail, near the home of noted environmental author Rachel Carson, it is deliberately left rustic and unimproved.

The majority of the Northwest Branch stream valley is a riparian buffer, protected as parkland by the Maryland-National Capital Park and Planning Commission (M-NCPPC). The Rachel Carson Greenway planned by M-NCPPC will extend the Northwest Branch Trail into northern Montgomery County as an unimproved hiking trail, connecting to the Anacostia Tributary Trail System in Prince George's County.

Geology

This area was a favorite spot of Theodore Roosevelt.

Tributaries
 Bachelors Forest Tributary
 Bel Pre Creek
 Bryants Nursery Tributary
 Lamberton Drive Tributary
 Lockridge Drive Tributary
 Longmeade Tributary
 Norwood Tributary
 Old Orchard Tributary
 Rolling Stone Tributary
 Sandy Spring Tributary
 Sligo Creek
 Wheaton Park Tributary

Crossings

See also
List of Maryland rivers
Anacostia Tributary Trails

References

Bibliography

External links
 Neighbors of the Northwest Branch
 Anacostia Watershed Society - Detailed maps and photos of stream conditions
 Anacostia Watershed Restoration Partnership
 Northwest Branch Trail - Montgomery County Dept. of Parks
 Wheaton Regional Park - Montgomery County Dept. of Parks
 Anacostia Tributary Trail System - Prince George's County Dept. of Parks & Recreation
 Anacostia, Northwest Branch
 Northwest Branch Climbing Sections

Anacostia River
Rivers of Montgomery County, Maryland
Rivers of Prince George's County, Maryland
Rivers of Maryland